Workers Viewpoint is the section of the League for the Fifth International in Austria. From 2007 to 2011, its name was League for the Socialist Revolution.

Like other sections, it is involved in the independent youth group Revolution.

External links
Workers Viewpoint
Revolution Austria

Communism in Austria
League for the Fifth International
Organizations with year of establishment missing
Political organisations based in Austria
Trotskyist organizations in Europe